The Indiana Gazette is a public newspaper printed for Indiana County, Pennsylvania, and surrounding areas. It is delivered daily except for holidays and special occasions. It is located on Water Street in Indiana, Pennsylvania.

History
The Indiana Gazette was established by the Ray family 1890, and is printed by Indiana Printing and Publishing. The Indiana Printing and Publishing Company came to the Donnelly family when Joe Donnelly, father of current president Michael J. Donnelly, married into the Ray family. Joseph Donnelly wed Lucille Ray, daughter of the generation of Rays that founded the then-titled the Indiana Evening Gazette. Joseph and Lucy had three children, Hastie, Stacie and Michael.

Inside news
The daily newspaper carries local news, police reports, obituaries, national, international and sports news and comics. The Gazette's mascot, named "Iggy," is represented in local parades.

Online
The newspaper also offers online access; a subscription is required.

External links
 
 https://www.washingtontimes.com/topics/indiana-gazette/

Daily newspapers published in Pennsylvania
Indiana County, Pennsylvania
Newspapers established in 1890
1890 establishments in Pennsylvania